Jean-Carl Boucher (born February 19, 1994) is a Canadian actor and filmmaker from Quebec, best known for his role as Diego Molina on the show Tactik shown on Télé-Québec. He has also starred in A No-Hit No-Run Summer (Un été sans point ni coup sûr) and 1981. He is good friends with actor Alexandre Bacon who often provides voiceovers.

Flashwood, his debut feature film as a director, was released in 2020.

Filmography
 2007 : The Schoolyard (Les Grands) by Chloé Leriche
 2008 : A No-Hit No-Run Summer (Un été sans point ni coup sûr) by Francis Leclerc : la Crevette
 2009 : 1981 : Ricardo Trogi
 2009 : Tactik : Diego Molina
 2010 : Les Parent : Jessy
 2014 : 1987 : Ricardo Trogi
 2016 : The History of Love : Herman Connor
 2018 : 1991 : Ricardo Trogi
 2018 : Black Forest (Forêt Noire) : Danny Gauthier

Awards
 Nomination for Best Actor at the 12th Jutra Awards for 1981.

References

External links
 

1994 births
Living people
Male actors from Quebec
Male actors from Regina, Saskatchewan
Canadian male child actors
Canadian male film actors
Fransaskois people
21st-century Canadian male actors